Stackelberg, also Stakelberg is the name of an old and influential Baltic German noble family of German origin, represented at the Swedish and Finnish houses of nobility.

History
The family was first mentioned in 1244 in Köln in a written document with Waldewerus de Stackelberg and in 1306 in Riga with Henricus de Stackelberg. They were mentioned as vassals of the Prince-Bishops of Dorpat. The family members were raised to the rank of Baron in 1714 and later in 1727 to the rank of Count in Sweden. They were also awarded with the title of Imperial Count in 1776 and in 1786. The title of Baron in Russian Empire was granted to them on December 7, 1854. Different branches of the Stackelberg family use different surnames; for instance, a nobiliary particle preposition i.e. von. The Stackelberg family used to be one of the biggest landowning families in the Baltic region.

Notable members 

 Berndt Robert Gustaf Stackelberg (1784–1845), Swedish military officer, diplomat and governor of Saint Barthélemy
 Count Ernst von Stackelberg (1813–1870), Russian general and a diplomat
 Count Gustav Ernst von Stackelberg (1766–1850), Russian diplomat
 Otto Magnus von Stackelberg (1732–1800), Russian ambassador
 Otto Magnus von Stackelberg (1786–1837), Baltic German, Imperial Russian archaeologist
 Count Reinhold Adolphe Louis Stackelberg (1822–1871), Swedish estate owner and Christian revivalist preacher

References 

Stackelberg family
Russian noble families
Swedish noble families
Baltic nobility
German noble families